Frederick Theodore 'Moose' Heyliger (June 23, 1916 – November 3, 2001) was an officer with Easy Company, 2nd Battalion, 506th Parachute Infantry Regiment, in the 101st Airborne Division of the United States Army during World War II. He took part in D-Day and Operation Market Garden. Heyliger was portrayed in the HBO miniseries Band of Brothers by Stephen McCole.

Early life
Heyliger was born in Concord, Middlesex County, Massachusetts. Heyliger worked as a farm hand throughout his youth, and graduated from the Lawrence Academy at Groton in 1937. Heyliger completed three years of college.

Military service
Heyliger was assigned to E Company before it left the U.S. and was later assigned as the Headquarters Company, 2nd Battalion, mortar platoon leader. After Richard Winters was assigned as 2nd Battalion Executive Officer (XO), First Lieutenant Heyliger took command of Easy Company from Winters' first replacement. Heyliger commanded Easy Company during Operation Pegasus on October 23, 1944, and oversaw the rescue and evacuation of some of the British 1st Airborne Division that were stranded on the German side of the line after the failed Operation Market Garden across the Rhine. After the successful rescue of 138 men from the British 1st Airborne Division, for which he received the British Military Cross, he was accidentally shot by one of his own men on October 31, 1944, while on patrol and talking with Richard Winters about commanding Easy Company. He then underwent skin and nerve grafts before being discharged in February 1947.

Later years and death
After Heyliger returned home to Massachusetts, he enrolled at the University of Massachusetts and graduated in 1950 with a degree in ornamental horticulture. Heyliger died on November 3, 2001, in Concord, Massachusetts, at the age of 85. He died one day before the 10th and final episode of Band of Brothers premiered on HBO.  He is buried in Sleepy Hollow Cemetery, Concord, Massachusetts.

References

1916 births
2001 deaths
United States Army personnel of World War II
Band of Brothers characters
Operation Pegasus
Recipients of the Military Cross
United States Army officers
People from Concord, Massachusetts
University of Massachusetts Amherst alumni
Military personnel from Massachusetts